Stjepan Prauhardt (5 December 1904 – 1 October 1983) was a Yugoslav sports shooter. He competed in the 300 m rifle, three positions event at the 1952 Summer Olympics.

References

1904 births
1983 deaths
Yugoslav male sport shooters
Olympic shooters of Yugoslavia
Shooters at the 1952 Summer Olympics
Place of birth missing